Nowica may refer to the following villages:
Nowica, Lower Silesian Voivodeship (south-west Poland)
Nowica, Lesser Poland Voivodeship (south Poland)
Nowica, Warmian-Masurian Voivodeship (north Poland)
Nowica, Galicia – now the Village of Novytsya, Ivano-Frankivsk Oblast (western Ukraine)